TypeDB is an open-source, distributed, strongly-typed database with a logical type system. TypeQL is its query language. TypeDB models domains based on logical and object-oriented programming principles, composed of entity, relationship, and attribute types, as well as type hierarchies, roles, and rules.

TypeDB provides a way to describe the logical structures of data, which allows the tool to validate that code inserts and queries data correctly. Query validation goes beyond static type-checking, and includes logical validation of meaningless queries. TypeDB also encodes data for logical interpretation by a reasoning engine and enables type-inference and rule-inference, which create logical abstractions of data. This can allow for the discovery of facts and patterns that may otherwise be hard to find.

TypeDB is developed by Vaticle Ltd. and is published under the GNU Affero General Public License.
Vaticle was previously known as Grakn Labs; TypeDB as Grakn; and TypeQL as Graql.

Main features

Expressivity 

Entity-Relationship Model
TypeDB allows users to model their domains using the Entity-Relationship (ER) model. It is composed of entity types, relation types, and attribute types, with the introduction of role types. TypeDB allows users to leverage the full expressivity of the ER model, and describe schemas through first normal form.

Type Hierarchies
TypeDB allows users to model type inheritance into their domain model. Following logical and object-oriented principles, TypeDB allows data types to inherit the behaviours and properties of their supertypes. Complex data structures become reusable, and data interpretation becomes richer through polymorphism.

N-ary Relations
Relations often aren't just binary connections between two things. In complicated systems, three or more things can be related with each other at once. Representing them as separate binary relationships would cause a user to lose information. TypeDB can represent an arbitrary number of things as one relation.

Nested Relations
Relations are concepts used to describe the association between two or more things. Sometimes, things can be relations themselves. TypeDB can represent such a structure, as it enables relations to be nested in another relation, allowing a user to express their system's model in a natural form.

Safety 

Logical Data Validation
Inserted data gets validated beyond static type-checking of attribute value types. Entities are validated to only have the correct attributes, and relations are validated to only relate things that are logically allowed. TypeDB performs validation of inserted entities and relations by evaluating the polymorphic types of the things involved.

Logical Query Validation
Read queries executed on TypeDB go through a type resolution process. This process not only can optimise a query's execution, but also acts as a static type checker to reject meaningless and unsatisfiable queries, which are likely to be user errors.

Logical inference  

Rules
TypeDB allows users to define rules in their schemas. This extends the expressivity of a model as it enables a system to derive new conclusions when a certain logical form in a dataset is satisfied. Like functions in programming, rules can chain onto one another, creating abstractions of behaviour at the data level.

Inference 
TypeDB's inference facility translates one query into all of its possible interpretations. This happens through two mechanisms: type-based inference and rule-based inference. This derives new conclusions and uncovers hidden relationships, and also enables the abstraction of complex patterns into simple queries.

Architecture
TypeDB is composed of two parts: TypeDB the storage, and TypeQL the language.

TypeDB
TypeDB is a database with a rich and logical type system. Under the hood, TypeDB has built an expressive type system with a transactional query interface. TypeDB’s type system is based on hypergraph theory, a subfield in mathematics that generalises an edge to be a set of vertices. The hypergraph data structure itself is represented in the form of key-value pairs and persisted on a distributed NoSQL database, RocksDB. Using the Raft algorithm, TypeDB provides a distributed system designed to be shared and replicated over a network of computers.

TypeQL
TypeQL is TypeDB’s declarative reasoning (through OLTP) query language that creates a higher level abstraction over complex relationships. TypeQL allows users to derive implicit information that is hidden in a dataset, as well as reduce the complexity of that information.

Licensing
TypeDB is available in two versions: an open source version and a commercial version (TypeDB Cluster). The open source version is available for free under the GNU Affero General Public License, version 3. It is limited to running on one node only due to the lack of clustering and comes without security.

The commercial product, TypeDB Cluster, allows for high-availability, horizontal scalability and security. TypeDB Cluster is available under a closed-source Commercial license.

References

Bibliography

 

Graph databases
Free database management systems
Free software programmed in Java (programming language)
2016 software